Mithril is a Celtic music / World music quartet located in Mobile, Alabama in the Southeastern United States. Their music combines traditional melodies from many Celtic nations, the Middle East, and around the world.

The band
Tom Morley: (fiddle, bouzouki, mandolin, guitar)
Andra Bohnet: (Irish flute, penny whistle, fife, Celtic harp)
Ben Harper (guitar, bass guitar, flute)
Sam Gaston: djembe, doumbek, percussion, melodica)

Discography
Bottom of the Punch Bowl (2015)
Along the Road (2012)
Tangled Up (2009)
The Return Home (2007)
Live in Concert (2005)
Winter's Day (2004)
Banish Misfortune (2002)

Additional information
The band is named after Mithril, a fictional material from J. R. R. Tolkien's universe, Middle-earth. 
Green Linnet recording artist Manus McGuire says "Mithril's 'Live In Concert CD gives us a great insight into four musicians on top of their game. The group's classical music roots provide a lovely backdrop to the real traditional feel throughout the recording."
Mithril has been featured on the syndicated radio program Celtic Connections.
Mithril's official website www.mithril.us

References

Celtic music in the United States
Celtic music groups
American world music groups
Things named after Tolkien works